Malikwad is a village which is located in the Belgaum district of Karnataka state, India. It is located on the banks of the Doodhganga River.  The river acts as the border between Karnataka and Maharashtra. Due to the border separation, the people in the area are bilingual; many can speak as well as write both Kannada and Marathi languages. Facilities in the village include schools, a library, and public toilets.  Agriculture is a mainstream source of income of the village.  It is regarded as one of the highest sugarcane producing villages. Along with sugarcane, farmers also grow different kinds of fruits and vegetables such as tomatoes and bananas. Almost one member of every family in the area is in the Indian army, so people have called this village “Sainik Malikwad,” the word “sainik” meaning “soldier.”

The infrastructure of the village is very simple. It has a main road that connects the highway to the village. As soon as one enters the village, there is the Ganesh temple, and as the villagers are devout, there are eight temples throughout the village. Roads are surfaced and among the traditional village houses stand some larger buildings.  In the middle of the village is a wada located upon a hill; this is the house of the sarkar who ruled the village a long time ago, and their family still lives there. There is a society office which distributes grains, rice, and oil to the poor families. At the end of the road is the Gram Panchayat Karyalay, an office which holds all records of villagers.

References

Villages in Belagavi district